The Regional District of Mount Waddington (RDMW) is a regional district in British Columbia. It takes in the lower Central Coast region centred on the Queen Charlotte Strait coast of northern Vancouver Island and the adjoining parts of mainland British Columbia. It has a total land area of 20,288.4 km2 (7,833.4 sq mi) and a 2016 census population of 11,035 persons, most of which is in towns on Vancouver Island and adjoining islands. The administrative centre is in the town of Port McNeill. Other municipalities include the district municipality of Port Hardy, the village of Port Alice, and the village of Alert Bay.

Demographics

Note: Totals greater than 100% due to multiple origin responses.

Municipalities
Alert Bay
Port Alice
Port Hardy
Port McNeill

Geography
The region is named for Mount Waddington, which lies on its northeastern boundary and is the highest peak entirely within British Columbia (Fairweather Mountain, on the Alaska boundary, is the highest). Also within the regional district is Mount Silverthrone, the highest volcano in Canada, located in the remote Ha-Iltzuk Icefield. The eastern land boundary of the regional district is largely the divide of the Coast Mountains, inland from which is the Chilcotin District, which is part of the Cariboo Regional District. The northern land boundary with the Central Coast Regional District follows a watershed boundary, separating streams that flow into Queen Charlotte Sound north of Cape Caution from those that flow into the Sound to the south or that flow into Queen Charlotte Strait.

The RDMW is relatively underpopulated in comparison to other regional districts, due largely to the fact that most of its land area is rugged mountainscape or remote islands. Within its boundaries are the traditional territories of the Kwakwaka'wakw, who form a significant minority in the region and are the majority in many smaller communities. Band governments and reserve lands are not part of the governance system of the regional district, which is formed of the mayors of the towns and representatives from its electoral areas (though First Nations people living inside municipalities are eligible voters). Sointula, on Malcolm Island, is a historic Finnish Canadian settlement which began life as a cooperative; a similar Danish experiment at Cape Scott was a failure, although the Danish name Holberg remains in the area.  Logging and fishing and associated transport and other services, in addition to tourism, are the mainstays of the economic life of the communities of the regional district.

See also
Mount Waddington
Mount Silverthrone

Notes

References
 Community Profile: Mount Waddington; Statistics Canada

Specific

External links

 
Mount Waddington
Mount Waddington Regional District